Novi Zrin was a fortress of the Zrinski (Zrínyi in Hungarian) noble family built near the Donja Dubrava village in the northernmost part of Croatia (at the border village of Őrtilos in Hungary) on the mouth of river Mura into Drava between 1661 and 1664.

Its purpose was to prevent the Ottoman military forces from advancing further into Croatia. The Ottomans attacked it several times from 1662 to 1664, but did not manage to conquer it. Finally, at the beginning of June 1664 a large Ottoman army, numbering up to 100,000 men, led personally by the Grand Vizier Köprülü Fazıl Ahmed Pasha, besieged it and destroyed on 7 July 1664.

Gallery

See also
 First Battle of Novi Zrin
 Second Battle of Novi Zrin
 Siege of Novi Zrin (1664)
 Nikola VII Zrinski

Bibliography

External links 
 Novi Zrin base drawing
 Novi Zrin look and history
 Novi Zrin draft and memorial obelisk

History of Međimurje
Castles in Croatia
17th-century establishments in Croatia
17th-century establishments in Hungary
1661 establishments in Europe
Tourist attractions in Međimurje County